The Ministry of Reintegration of Temporarily Occupied Territories is a government ministry in Ukraine officially established on 20 April 2016 to manage occupied parts of Donetsk, Luhansk, and Crimea regions affected by Russian military intervention of 2014. After the 2022 Russian invasion of Ukraine, the Ministry also managed the newly-occupied territories across Ukraine, especially Kherson and Zaporizhzhia which were annexed by Russia along with Donetsk and Luhansk.

The Honcharuk Government in August 2019 merged the Ministry for Veterans Affairs into the ministry. But its succeeding Shmyhal Government reversed this merger in March 2020.

History
Vadym Chernysh was on 14 April 2016  appointed as the first Minister of Temporarily Occupied Territories and IDPs in the Groysman government. On 20 April 2016 his ministry was created by merging the State Agency for restoration of Donbas (formerly part of Ministry of Regional Development) and the State Service for Russian annexed Crimea and Sevastopol (formerly under direct administration of the Cabinet of Ukraine). Chernysh is the former head of the State Agency for restoration of Donbas.

The ministry tries to "search for solutions and reintegration strategies" for Ukraine to regain control Crimea and parts of the historical region Donbas. Ukraine lost control over Crimea, which was unilaterally annexed by Russia in March 2014. In the Donbas region of eastern Ukraine, pro-Russian protests escalated into an armed separatist insurgency early in April 2014, when masked gunmen took control of several of the region's government buildings and towns. This led to the creation of the self-proclaimed Donetsk People's Republic and Luhansk People's Republic. Violence between the Ukrainian army and the forces of the two breakaway republics escalated into an armed conflict known as the Russo-Ukrainian War. The war in Donbas led to 1.6 million people becoming internally displaced persons, according to the registry of the Ukrainian government. The Office of the United Nations High Commissioner for Human Rights reported in March 2016 that 800,000 to 1 million of them lived within Ukrainian government controlled Ukraine.

The Honcharuk Government (on 29 August 2019) merged the Ministry for Veterans Affairs into the ministry degrading the first to an agency as it previously existed. On 23 January 2020 then Minister Oksana Koliada stated that the Ministry would likely be split up again into a separate Ministry for Veterans Affairs with the Ministry of Temporarily Occupied Territories and IDPs to be renamed "Ministry of Reintegration". Indeed, on 4 March 2020 the new Shmyhal Government undid the merge of the two ministries.

List of ministers

Heads of predecessor government agencies of the ministry

State Agency for restoration of Donbas

State Service on issues of the Autonomous Republic of Crimea and Sevastopol city

List of ministers of the Ministry of Temporarily Occupied Territories [and IDPs]

See also
 Temporarily occupied and uncontrolled territories of Ukraine
 Russian military intervention in Ukraine (2014–present)
 Temporarily occupied and uncontrolled territories of Ukraine (2014–present)
 Anti-Terrorist Operation Zone (Ukraine)
 Russo-Ukrainian War
 Humanitarian situation during the war in Donbas

Notes

References

External links
November 2016 interview with minister Vadym Chernysh by UNIAN

Temporarily Occupied Territories and IDPs
Temporarily Occupied Territories and IDPs
Ukraine, Temporarily Occupied Territories and IDPs
Ukraine
Ukraine
Ukraine
Ukraine
Ukraine
2016 establishments in Ukraine
War in Donbas